is a passenger railway station in located in the city of Nabari,  Mie Prefecture, Japan, operated by the private railway operator Kintetsu Railway.

Lines
Akameguchi Station is served by the Osaka Line, and is located 64.0 rail kilometers from the starting point of the line at Ōsaka Uehommachi Station.

Station layout
Akameguchi Station has two opposed side platforms connected by an underground passage.

Platforms

Adjacent stations

History
Akameguchi Station opened on October 10, 1930, as a station on the Sangu Express Electric Railway. After merging with Osaka Electric Kido on March 15, 1941, the line became the Kansai Express Railway's Osaka Line. This line was merged with the Nankai Electric Railway on June 1, 1944, to form Kintetsu.

Passenger statistics
In fiscal 2019, the station was used by an average of 569 passengers daily (boarding passengers only).

Surrounding area
Nabari City Kinsei Akame Elementary School

See also
List of railway stations in Japan

References

External links

 Kintetsu: Akameguchi Station

Railway stations in Japan opened in 1930
Railway stations in Mie Prefecture
Stations of Kintetsu Railway
Nabari, Mie